Pierre Durand (born 16 February 1955) is a French show jumping champion, and 1988 Olympic champion.

Olympic record
Durand participated at the 1988 Summer Olympics in Seoul, where he won a gold medal in Individual Jumping, and also a team bronze medal.

In film
Durand is played by Guillaume Canet in Jappeloup, a film by Christian Duguay about the bond he developed with Jappeloup until they won at the Olympics. He sued the producers for misuse of the brand "Jappeloup".

References

External links
 
 

1955 births
Living people
Olympic gold medalists for France
Olympic bronze medalists for France
Equestrians at the 1984 Summer Olympics
Equestrians at the 1988 Summer Olympics
Olympic equestrians of France
French male equestrians
Olympic medalists in equestrian
Medalists at the 1988 Summer Olympics
20th-century French people